The 1917–18 Boston University men's ice hockey season was the inaugural season of play for the program.

Season
During World War I, Boston University agreed to play cross-town rival Boston College in a game of ice hockey. It was the first official game for the program but, because of the war, the team would not play another contest until 1920.

Note: Boston University's athletic programs weren't known as the 'Terriers' until 1922.

Roster

Standings

Schedule and Results

|-
!colspan=12 style=";" | Regular Season

References

Boston University Terriers men's ice hockey seasons
Boston University
Boston University
Boston University